Nkayishana Maphumzana 'Phumuzuzulu' Solomon kaDinuzulu (1891 – 4 March 1933) was the king of the Zulu nation from 1913 until his death on 4 March 1933 at Kambi at the age of 41 or 42. He was born on the island of St. Helena during the exile there of his father, king Dinuzulu kaCetshwayo.

In conjunction with the ANC he was a founder of the original Inkatha (or Inkatha kaZulu as it was known) in the 1920s. It was mainly formed to act as a rallying point against Jan Smuts' Native Affairs Bill of 1920.

One of his sisters was Princess Magogo kaDinuzulu, who became famous as a singer of traditional Zulu songs as well as for being the mother of Mangosuthu Buthelezi, leader of the Inkatha Freedom Party (IFP).

He was succeeded by his son Cyprian Bhekuzulu kaSolomon.

1891 births
1933 deaths
Zulu kings